Marcelo Llorente (born March 7, 1977, in Miami, Florida) is a former Republican representative in the House of Representatives of the U.S. state of Florida. He was first elected in 2002 and re-elected in 2004, 2006, and 2008.  At the time of his election to the Florida House of Representatives, Marcelo was the third youngest person ever elected to that body.

On June 17, 2009, Marcelo Llorente announced that he would be run for Mayor of Miami-Dade County in 2012. The election took place in 2011, due to a recall of the current mayor. In a crowded field of 11 candidates vying for the office of the mayor; Llorente came in third place with 28,334 votes, or 14.83%, thereby missing the runoff that Julio Robaina and Carlos Gimenez proceeded to. Gimenez won the election.

He graduated from Belen Jesuit Preparatory School in 1994 and later received his bachelor's degree from Tulane University in 1998. In addition, he received his Juris Doctor from Florida State University in 2001. He is a member of the American Bar Association, the Florida Bar Association and the Cuban-American Bar Association. He is married to Cristina Elena Suarez and they have three children Isabella, Marcelo Jr, and Nicolas.

References

External links
Official biography for Llorente

Florida State University College of Law alumni
Republican Party members of the Florida House of Representatives
American politicians of Cuban descent
Tulane University alumni
1977 births
Living people
Hispanic and Latino American state legislators in Florida